Stracchino, also known as crescenza, is a type of Italian cow's-milk cheese, typical of Lombardy, Piedmont, Veneto, and Liguria. It is eaten very young, has no rind and a very soft, creamy texture and normally a mild and delicate flavour. It is normally square in shape.

The name of the cheese derives from the Lombard adjective strach, meaning "tired". It is said that milk produced by tired cows coming down from the alpine pastures in the autumn is richer in fats and more acidic. These qualities were discovered, according to legend, in the milk of cows who were moved seasonally, up and down the Alps, to different pastures. The milk of such cows gives the cheese its characteristic flavours.

Stracchino is usually eaten on its own but also as a filling for some kinds of bread: in Recco, on the Ligurian riviera east of Genoa, focaccia col formaggio ("cheese focaccia") or focaccia di Recco is typically filled with crescenza, while in Romagna and in parts of some nearby regions (e.g. northern Marche, Umbria and eastern Tuscany) it is a common filling for the cascione which is made out of piadina, a thin flat bread.

References

Italian cheeses
Cow's-milk cheeses
Ark of Taste foods